Trabrennbahn Krieau (Krieau Race Track) is a horse racing track in Leopoldstadt district, Vienna. It was opened in 1878. The old grandstand and a tower for officials were finished in 1913. Krieau Race Track is the second oldest harness racing track in Europe after the 1834 built Central Moscow Hippodrome.

Major annual racing events are the 1886 established Österreichisches Traber-Derby and the Graf Kalman Hunyady Memorial, held since 1901. Krieau Race Track is also used as a concert venue, recently hosting artists like Avicii, Robbie Williams, Green Day and Bon Jovi.

References

External links 

Horse racing venues in Austria
Sports venues in Vienna
Leopoldstadt